Joan Hartigan defeated Nancye Wynne 6–4, 6–4, in the final to win the women's singles tennis title at the 1936 Australian Championships.

Seeds
The seeded players are listed below. Joan Hartigan is the champion; others show the round in which they were eliminated.

 Thelma Coyne (semifinals)
 Joan Hartigan (champion)
 Nell Hopman (quarterfinals)
 Dorothy Stevenson (second round)
 May Blick (semifinals)
 Nancye Wynne (finalist)
 Gwen Griffiths (quarterfinals)
 May Hardcastle (quarterfinals)

Draw

Key
 Q = Qualifier
 WC = Wild card
 LL = Lucky loser
 r = Retired

Finals

Earlier rounds

Section 1

Section 2

See also
1936 Australian Championships – Men's singles

References

External links
 Source for seedings and the draw
 Source for the first-round results
 Source for the second-round results

1936 in women's tennis
1936
1936 in Australian women's sport
Women's Singles